Mount Galatea is the highest peak of the Kananaskis Range, a subrange of the Canadian Rockies in the province of Alberta. It is located in the upper Spray Lakes Valley of the Kananaskis Country system of provincial parks. The mountain was named after the Royal Navy cruiser HMS Galatea.

Geology

Mount Galatea is composed of sedimentary rock laid down during the Precambrian to Jurassic periods. Formed in shallow seas, this sedimentary rock was pushed east and over the top of younger rock during the Laramide orogeny.

Climate

Based on the Köppen climate classification, Mount Galatea is located in a subarctic climate zone with cold, snowy winters, and mild summers.

References

External links 
 Fresh-Oxygen - route beta, photos

Galatea
Alberta's Rockies